The Newton Community School District is a public school district based in Newton, Iowa, and serves the city of Newton and surrounding areas in Jasper County.

Tom Messinger was hired as superintendent is 2020, after previously serving as superintendent in Red Oak.

The school's mascot is the Cardinal. Their colors are red and black.

Schools
The district operates seven schools:
Aurora Heights Elementary School
Emerson Hough Elementary School
Thomas Jefferson Elementary School
Woodrow Wilson Elementary School
Berg Middle School
Newton Senior High School
Basics and Beyond Alternative School

Newton High School

Athletics
The Newton Cardinals compete in the Little Hawkeye Conference in the following sports:

Cross Country (boys and girls)
Volleyball (girls)
Football
(2-time State Champions - 1952, 1980)
Basketball (boys and girls)
 Boys' Basketball (3-time State Champions - 1926, 1963, 1964)
Bowling
Wrestling 
Swimming (boys and girls)
Track and Field (boys and girls)
Golf (boys and girls)
 Boys' (2-time State Champions - 1990, 1994)
 Coed (2-time State Champions - 1975, 1979)
Tennis (boys and girls)
Soccer (boys and girls)
Baseball (boys)
Softball (girls)

Enrollment

See also
List of school districts in Iowa
List of high schools in Iowa

References

External links
 Newton Community School District

Education in Jasper County, Iowa
School districts in Iowa